The Pakistan women's national cricket team toured Sri Lanka in April 1998. They played Sri Lanka in three One Day Internationals and one Test match, losing all four matches. The Test match was the first ever played in the format by either side, and the only one that has ever been played by Sri Lanka.

Squads

WODI Series

1st ODI

2nd ODI

3rd ODI

Only WTest

References

External links
Pakistan Women tour of Sri Lanka 1997/98 from Cricinfo

Pakistan women's national cricket team tours
Women's international cricket tours of Sri Lanka
1998 in women's cricket